Andrijevica Municipality is one of the municipalities of Montenegro. The center is the town of Andrijevica. Its territory is outspread on 340 km2 and it is surrounded by massives of mountains Komovi, Bjelasica and Accursed Mountains in northeastern Montenegro.

Geography and tourism 
Andrijevica is surrounded by the mountains of Komovi, Bjelasica and Accursed Mountains, situated on a terrace 40m above river Lim. Tourist activities in the area includes mountaineering (alpinism, hiking), biking, rafting, sports (soccer, basketball), fishing, etc. Main tourist attraction is mountain Komovi (2461 m). This mountain can be accessed by a car in less than 45 minutes, by the mountainous Andrijevica - Mateševo road. Andrijevica is connected with rest of Montenegro by two-laned motorways. Andrijevica is on the corridor of the future Bar-Boljare motorway.

Municipal parliament
The municipal parliament consists of 31 deputies elected directly for a four-year term. Following the last local election in August 2020, the For the Future of Andrijevica and the Andrijevica is Our Nation coalitions form a majority in the local parliament with 16 deputies.

Demographics 
According to the 2011 census, Andrijevica Municipality had a population of 5,071.

Gallery

References 

 
Municipalities of Montenegro